Malik Umar Farooq is a Pakistani politician who was a Member of the Provincial Assembly of the Punjab, from September 2016 to May 2018.

Political career

He was elected to the Provincial Assembly of the Punjab as a candidate of Pakistan Muslim League (Nawaz) from Constituency PP-7 (Rawalpindi-VII) in by polls held in September 2016.

References

Living people
Punjab MPAs 2013–2018
Pakistan Muslim League (N) politicians
Year of birth missing (living people)